Kalinino is a rural locality (a selo) and the administrative center of Kalininsky Selsoviet of Mikhaylovsky District, Amur Oblast, Russia. The population was 580 as of 2018. There are 10 streets.

Geography 
Kalinino is located on the left bank of the Amur River, 63 km southeast of Poyarkovo (the district's administrative centre) by road. Vinnikovo is the nearest rural locality.

References 

Rural localities in Mikhaylovsky District, Amur Oblast